is a Japanese actor assigned to First Place talent agency. He and his four brothers formed the Wakaba Brothers.

Filmography

Television

Film

Video on demand

Awards

References

External links
 
 

1989 births
Japanese male film actors
Japanese male television actors
Living people
Japanese male child actors
20th-century Japanese male actors
21st-century Japanese male actors
Horikoshi High School alumni